Ágnes Simon may refer to:

 Agnes Simon (born 1935), former table tennis player from Hungary
 Ágnes Simon (skier) (born 1974), cross-country skier for Hungary